Mere is a civil parish in Cheshire East, England. It contains nine buildings that are recorded in the National Heritage List for England as designated listed buildings, all of which are at Grade II. This grade is the lowest of the three gradings given to listed buildings and is applied to "buildings of national importance and special interest". The parish is almost entirely rural. The listed buildings include Mere Old Hall and associated structures, structures associated with Mere New Hall, cottages, a farmhouse, a hotel, and an AA telephone booth.

See also
Listed buildings in Aston by Budworth
Listed buildings in High Legh
Listed buildings in Knutsford
Listed buildings in Millington
Listed buildings in Rostherne
Listed buildings in Tabley Superior
Listed buildings in Tatton

References

Citations

Sources

 

Listed buildings in the Borough of Cheshire East
Lists of listed buildings in Cheshire